The European Union Military Assistance Mission in support of Ukraine (EUMAM Ukraine) is the European Union's (EU) first-ever military assistance mission for Ukraine set up on 17 October 2022. The decision to establish EUMAM was made by the Council of the European Union in response to Ukraine's request for military support during the ongoing Russian invasion of the country. The primary aim of the mission is to provide training to the Armed Forces of Ukraine in the territory of the EU member states.

Background 

The diplomatic framework for the establishment of the EUMAM Ukraine was created by the 23–24 June 2022 EU's statement on its commitment to providing "military support to help Ukraine exercise its inherent right of self-defence against the Russian aggression" and the 30 September 2022 official letter by the Ministers for Foreign Affairs and Defense of Ukraine to the High Representative, requesting military support.  The European Union Advisory Mission Ukraine to support reforms in civilian security sector has been active since 2014.

Mission 
The EUMAM Ukraine envisages individual, collective and specialized training to the Armed Forces of Ukraine, including to their Territorial Defense Forces, and coordination and synchronization of the EU member states' activities supporting the delivery of training. EUMAM Ukraine will operate in the territory of the EU member states, with its Operational Headquarters within the European External Action Service (EEAS) in Brussels. The French naval officer, Vice Admiral Hervé Bléjean—the incumbent Director of the Military Planning and Conduct Capability within the EEAS—was appointed the Mission Commander. The EUMAM's mandate will initially last two years, with the financial reference amount of 106,7 million euros.

The integration of the training components to create formed units takes place in a multinational Combined Arms Training Command (CAT-C) established in Poland under the command of the Polish Major General Piotr Trytek. A multinational Special Training Command (STC) under the command of the German Lieutenant General Andreas Marlow commands training activities in Germany to further enhance the training offer in full coordination with CAT-C. Other Member States provide specific training across Europe.

EUMAM works closely together with all other like-minded international partners to provide training support to the Ukrainian Armed Forces. All mission activities are located on EU soil.

Reactions 
The EU's plan to establish a military training mission for Ukraine was condemned by the Russian Foreign Ministry spokeswoman Maria Zakharova on 6 October 2022; she claimed the mission would make the EU "a party to the conflict".

See also
 Ukraine–European Union relations
Operation Interflex
Operation Unifier
Ukraine Defense Contact Group

References

External links
European Union Military Assistance Mission in support of Ukraine

Military training missions of the European Union
Military operations of the 2022 Russian invasion of Ukraine
2022 establishments in Ukraine
2022 in the European Union
Ukraine–European Union relations